The Ambassador of Malaysia to the Bolivarian Republic of Venezuela is the head of Malaysia's diplomatic mission to Venezuela. The position has the rank and status of an Ambassador Extraordinary and Plenipotentiary and is based in the Embassy of Malaysia, Caracas.

List of heads of mission

Chargé d'Affaires to Venezuela

Ambassadors to Venezuela

See also
 Malaysia–Venezuela relations

References 

 
Venezuela
Malaysia